Statistics of Swiss Super League in the 1974–75 season.

Overview
The Nationalliga A season 1974–75 was contested under 14 teams. These were the top 12 teams from the previous 1973–74 season and the two newly promoted teams Luzern and Vevey-Sports. The championship was played in a double round robin. The champions would qualify for the 1975–76 European Cup, the second and third placed teams were to qualify for 1975–76 UEFA Cup and the last two teams in the table at the end of the season were to be relegated. Zürich won the championship six points ahead of both BSC Young Boys who were second and Grasshopper Club who were third. Luzern and  Vevey-Sports suffered relegation.

League standings

Results

Top goalscorers

References

Sources 
 Switzerland 1974–75 at RSSSF

Swiss Football League seasons
Swiss
1974–75 in Swiss football